Hadynkivtsi is a village located in Chortkiv Raion (district) of Ternopil Oblast (province in western Ukraine). It belongs to Kopychyntsi urban hromada, one of the hromadas of Ukraine. 

Until 18 July 2020, Hadynkivtsi belonged to Husiatyn Raion. The raion was abolished in July 2020 as part of the administrative reform of Ukraine, which reduced the number of raions of Ternopil Oblast to three. The area of Husiatyn Raion was merged into Chortkiv Raion.

References 

Villages in Chortkiv Raion